The following Confederate States Army units and commanders fought in the Battle of McDowell of the American Civil War. The Union order of battle is listed separately.

Abbreviations used

Military rank
 Gen = General
 LTG = Lieutenant General
 MG = Major General
 BG = Brigadier General
 Col = Colonel
 Ltc = Lieutenant Colonel
 Maj = Major
 Cpt = Captain
 Lt = Lieutenant
 Sgt = Sergeant

Other
 w = wounded
 mW = mortally wounded
 k = killed

Jackson's Command
MG Thomas J. Jackson

Valley District
MG Thomas J. Jackson

Army of the Northwest
BG Edward "Allegheny" Johnson (w)

References
  May 8, 1862 - Engagement Near McDowell (Bull Pasture Mountain), Va. The War of the Rebellion: A Compilation of the Official Records of the Union and Confederate Armies. United States War Department.  Volume XII, Chapter XXIV, pp. 460–488.  (1885)

American Civil War orders of battle